Michael Angara is a Papua New Guinean former professional rugby league footballer who represented Papua New Guinea at the 1995 World Cup.

Playing career
Angara made his debut for Papua New Guinea in 1990, playing two test matches against Great Britain. He became a regular member of the test side and was included in the squad for the 1995 World Cup, where he played in one match against the New Zealand national rugby league team. In 1996 he played his last test match for Papua New Guinea, a defeat by New Zealand.

References

Living people
Hagen Eagles players
Papua New Guinea national rugby league team players
Papua New Guinean rugby league players
Rugby league locks
Rugby league second-rows
Year of birth missing (living people)